Mustang is an album by American jazz saxophonist Curtis Amy featuring performances recorded in 1967 and released on the Verve label.

Track listing
All compositions by Curtis Amy, except as indicated.
 "Mustang" (Sonny Red) – 3:20
 "Shaker Heights" – 11:56
 "Enojo" – 3:37
 "Mustang" (Red) – 5:14
 "Please Send Me Someone to Love" (Percy Mayfield) – 3:26
 "Old Devil Moon" (Burton Lane, Yip Harburg) – 6:04

Personnel
Curtis Amy – soprano saxophone, tenor saxophone
Leroy Cooper – baritone saxophone
Jimmy Owens – trumpet, flugelhorn
Carl Lynch – guitar
Kenny Barron – piano
Edgar Willis – bass
Bruno Carr – drums
Eva Harris – vocals (track 5)

References

1967 albums
Curtis Amy albums
Albums produced by Joel Dorn
Verve Records albums